The Blake School is a private, coeducational, nonsectarian PK12 college preparatory day school, established in 1900. Blake is located on three campuses around the Twin Cities area of Minnesota: the upper school (9–12) is in Minneapolis; administration offices, middle school (6–8) is in Hopkins, Minnesota, and half of the lower school is also in Hopkins, Minnesota connected to the middle school; and the other half of the lower school is in Wayzata, Minnesota.

History

During the early 20th century, two schools were founded in Minneapolis to prepare students for elite colleges in the Northeast: the Blake School for boys and Northrop Collegiate School for girls. A third school, Highcroft Country Day School serving students of both sexes, was incorporated during the migration to Minneapolis suburbs. In 1974, the three schools merged to become the Blake Schools, with its first coeducational class graduating in 1975.

The Blake School

In 1907, William M. Blake established the Blake School, a private, preparatory school for boys, in Minneapolis. Three years later, Charles C. Bovey, a local businessman, wanted to reform Blake, and put it on the same plane as Eastern preparatory schools.

With help from William Blake, new Board of Trustees Chairman Charles Bovey asked sixteen other local business leaders to contribute $2,500 each towards the school's first capital drive. In 1911, these original guarantors hired Charles B. Newton, a Princeton and Harvard alumnus, to replace William Blake as headmaster. Newton envisioned a school "not only for the wealthy, but for the worthy." The school incorporated on May 5, 1911, with all but two guarantors serving on the Board of Trustees. In 1912, their pooled resources enabled the construction of a new building in suburban Hopkins, with the site, now known as Blake Campus, being the current home of the middle school and one of the two lower school campuses.

The Northrop Collegiate School

In 1900, Zulema A. Ruble, a Smith College alumna, and Carrie Bartlett established Graham Hall, a private school for girls, in Minneapolis. In 1914, a group of Minneapolis leaders purchased Graham Hall and incorporated it as Northrop Collegiate School. In 1917, the school relocated within Minneapolis, with the site, now known as Northrop Campus, being the current home of the upper school campus.

The Highcroft Country Day School
In 1958, Sage Cowles, wife of John Cowles, Jr., along with two friends, established Highcroft Country Day School, a private, coeducational, nonsectarian K-9 school in Wayzata. Highcroft was designed to provide students in the far western suburbs (at the time) of the Twin Cities with an education near home. In 1960, the school building was constructed on land purchased and donated to the school, part of which was the former Highcroft estate in Wayzata, with the site, now known as Highcroft Campus, being the current home of the other lower school campus.

Preservation and present

In addition to retaining the original sites and all original buildings of the three schools as part of the campuses of The Blake School, the school also carries on other traditions, such as:
 from the Blake School for the boys – strong speech and debate programs, which are still maintained as an ongoing graduation requirement
 from Northrop Collegiate School – strong drama program, mascot of bears, along with the school color of blue
 from Highcroft Country Day School – growing athletic program for both boys and girls, along with school color of green.

The current head of school is Dr. Anne Stavney.

Blake alumni have held and currently hold various positions in government. Graduates from Blake have included: 2 U.S. Governors, 4 United States Senators, 3 members of The United States Congress, and 8 members of the Minnesota State Legislature.

Academics
The school serves approximately 1,400 students in prekindergarten through twelfth grade, with an average classroom size of 15–16 students, and average graduating class size of 130. The school's student-adult ratio is 9:1.

It takes 22 credits to graduate from The Blake School, with a minimum course load of five courses each semester. The Blake School also offers numerous global citizenship programs.

Accreditation
Blake is accredited by the Independent Schools Association of the Central States (ISACS), and is a member of the National Association of Independent Schools (NAIS), The College Board, National Association of College Admissions Counselors (NACAC), and the Cum Laude Society.

Recognition
Blake has received numerous accolades in recent years, including:
 U.S. Department of Education – Blue Ribbon School, 1989–90, 1992–93, 1993–94
 The College Board – "Exemplary AP English Literature and Composition Programs", 2007
 Wall Street Journal – "How the Schools Stack Up" (ranking of 41 for high schools with the best record of graduates attending eight top universities), 2007
 Character Education Partnership – National School of Character, 2009
 Mpls St.Paul Magazine – in school diversity and inclusion efforts, 2010
 MN Monthly Magazine – for leadership training of its students, 2012; Built to Lead

In 2011, Blake won the Minnesota Middle School Science Bowl, and was a competing school in the U.S. Department of Energy's National Science Bowl, winning the Hydrogen Fuel Cell Car Race portion.  In 2015, it won the Department of Energy's Minnesota High School Science Bowl and proceeded to compete at the national level in Washington D.C.

Blake is also home to one of the most active and successful high school debate programs in the entire country, having won several prestigious national championships, including the National Speech and Debate Association National Tournament, the National Debate Coaches Association National Tournament, and the Tournament of Champions. They are also the first school to qualify debaters to the Tournament of Champions in every event. Every December, Blake hosts the John Edie Debate Tournament, one of the largest regular-season speech and debate tournaments in the country.

Athletics

Blake competes in the Independent Metro Athletic Conference (IMAC) and formerly in the Tri-Metro Conference, which is part of the Minnesota State High School League. The school athletic teams are named the Blake Bears. The school offers twenty-eight sports, and fields over fifty athletic teams. The school also recognizes four club sports, including Ultimate Frisbee, Equestrian Team, Sailing, and the Stepps Dance Team. They are also recognized for having their hockey team in a cameo for the 1996 Disney movie D3: The Mighty Ducks when the movie was shot on set at Blake's Hopkins campus hockey arena; they came from behind down 9–0 to tie the Ducks 9-9, with 9 third period goals.

History
Blake won the Minnesota State High School League Challenge Cup, which awards schools based on their success in section and state fine arts and athletics tournaments, in 2005, 2007, 2009, 2012, 2013, 2014 and 2015 – more than any other school in state history – and was runner-up in 2006, 2008 and 2010, and placed third in 2011. In addition, many Blake alumni go on to play sports at the collegiate level, and some have even been drafted by professional sports franchises in the NHL, NFL, and MLB.

Notable alumni 
 A. J. Jackson (2002) - Lead Singer of Saint Motel
 Mark Dayton (1965) – U.S. Senator from Minnesota, 40th Governor of Minnesota, heir to Dayton's and Target Corporation, first husband of Alida Rockefeller Messinger
 Dean Phillips (1987) - U.S. Representative from Minnesota's 3rd Congressional District (2019–present), American businessman
 Kelly Morrison (1987) - Doctor and State Representative in the Minnesota House of Representatives
 Charles Baxter (1965) – author of National Book Award nominated The Feast of Love (2000)
Dani Cameranesi (2013) – Forward for U.S. women's hockey team at 2018 Winter Olympics
 Jack Dalrymple (1966) – former Governor of North Dakota
 Tom Davis (1970) – Emmy-winning comedy writer and performer
 David L. Downie (1979) - Scholar of global environmental politics
 David T. Ellwood (1971) – Dean of Harvard John F. Kennedy School of Government
 Al Franken (1969) – U.S. Senator from Minnesota, satirist, comedian, author, screenwriter, Saturday Night Live television performer, political commentator, radio host
 Dave Goldberg (1985) – businessman, CEO of Survey Monkey
 Poppy Harlow (2001) – CNN reporter
 Michael Ankeny (2009) - Alpine skier
 Thomas B. Heffelfinger (1966) – former U.S. Attorney of Minnesota
 George Roy Hill (1939) – Oscar-winning director of Butch Cassidy and the Sundance Kid
 Steve Kelley (1971) – Minnesota State Senator, 2000 U.S. Senate candidate, attorney
 Eleanor de Laittre  – artist
 Katrina Lake – CEO of Stitch Fix
 John Hugh MacMillan – businessman
 Whitney MacMillan (1947) – CEO of Cargill
 Marcia McNutt (1970) – president National Academy of Sciences
 Kent Patterson (2007) - NHL player
 Marcus Peacock (1978) – former Deputy Administrator U.S. Environmental Protection Agency
 Arthur Phillips (1986) - novelist, screenwriter
 Robert M. Pirsig (1943) - philosopher, author of Zen and the Art of Motorcycle Maintenance: An Inquiry into Values (1974)
 Jim Warden (1972) - Goaltender for U.S. men's hockey team at 1976 Winter Olympics
 J.T. Wyman (2004) – NHL player

References

External links
 Official School Website

Educational institutions established in 1900
Education in Minneapolis
High schools in Minneapolis
Buildings and structures in Minneapolis
Preparatory schools in Minnesota
Private elementary schools in Minnesota
Private middle schools in Minnesota
Private high schools in Minnesota
Schools in Hennepin County, Minnesota
1900 establishments in Minnesota